Cercottes is a railway station in Cercottes, Centre-Val de Loire, France. The station was opened on 5 May 1843, and is located on the Paris–Bordeaux railway line. The station is served by TER (local) services operated by the SNCF.

Train services

The station is served by regional trains (TER Centre-Val de Loire) to Orléans, Étampes and Paris. The station is served by about 6 trains per day in each direction.

References

Gallery

TER Centre-Val de Loire
Railway stations in France opened in 1843
Railway stations in Loiret